HMS Garlies (K475) was a British Captain-class frigate of the Royal Navy in commission during World War II. Originally constructed as the United States Navy Evarts-class destroyer escort USS Fleming (DE-271), she served in the Royal Navy from 1943 to 1945 and in the U.S. Navy as USS Garlies (DE-271) from August to October 1945.

Construction and transfer
The ship was ordered as the U.S. Navy destroyer escort DE-271 on 25 January 1942 and assigned the name USS Fleming, the first ship of the name, on 23 February 1943. She was laid down by the Boston Navy Yard in Boston, Massachusetts, on 7 April 1943 and launched on 19 May 1943, sponsored by Mrs. Michael E. Fleming. The United States transferred the ship to the United Kingdom under Lend-Lease on 13 June or 13 July 1943 (sources vary) while she was still under construction.

Service history

Royal Navy, 1943-1945
Christened on 13 September 1943, sponsored by Mrs. Frances Brown, the wife of J. Andrew Brown, the ship was commissioned into service in the Royal Navy as HMS Garlies (K475) the same day. She served on patrol and escort duty in the North Atlantic Ocean.

Garlies and Gore were forced to withdraw to Gibraltar to refuel on 1 March, but Affleck and Gould continued to attack U-358. During the afternoon of 1 March, U-358 succeeded in torpedoing and sinking Gould at  position , but then was forced to surface after 38 hours submerged and was sunk by gunfire from Affleck at position .

Garlies supported the invasion of Normandy in the summer of 1944.

The Royal Navy returned Garlies to the U.S. Navy at Chatham Dockyard, England, on 20 August 1945.

U.S. Navy, 1945
The ship was commissioned into the U.S. Navy as USS Garlies (DE-271) on 20 August 1945 simultaneously with her return. She departed Chatham on 30 August 1945 bound for the United States, and arrived at the Philadelphia Naval Shipyard in Philadelphia, Pennsylvania, on 8 September 1945. She remained there until decommissioned on 10 October 1945.

Disposal
The U.S. Navy struck Garlies from its Naval Vessel Register on 1 November 1945. She was sold to Thomas H. Barker on 19 July 1947 for scrapping.

References
 (USS Fleming)
 (USS Garlies)
Navsource Online: Destroyer Escort Photo Archive Fleming (DE-271)/HMS Garlies (K-475)
uboat.net HMS Garlies (K 475)
Captain Class Frigate Association HMS Garlies K475 (DE 271)

External links
 Photo gallery of HMS Garlies (K475)

 

Captain-class frigates
Evarts-class destroyer escorts
World War II frigates of the United Kingdom
World War II frigates and destroyer escorts of the United States
Ships built in Boston
1943 ships